NGC 5502 (also known as NGC 5503) is a spiral galaxy in the constellation of Ursa Major, registered in New General Catalogue (NGC).

Observation history
NGC 5502 was discovered by Edward Swift (father) on 9 May 1885 and later double listed by Lewis Swift (son) two days later on 11 May 1885 as NGC 5503. They gave descriptions "between two stars, one a wide double" and "forms with two stars a right triangle" respectively. In the New General Catalogue, John Louis Emil Dreyer described the galaxy as "most extremely faint, very small, round, very difficult, 2 stars near". The apparent difference in positions (2 arcmin) could have caused the confusions between NGC 5502 and NGC 5503.

Notes

References

Galaxies discovered in 1885
5502
Astronomical objects discovered in 1885
Spiral galaxies
NGC 5502